The 2018 California Vulcans football team represented California University of Pennsylvania during the 2018 NCAA Division II football season as a member of the Pennsylvania State Athletic Conference (PSAC).

Background

Previous season
In the 2017 season the Vulcan went 9–3 overall (5–2 PSAC) and lost in the first round of the NCAA Division II Football Championship to Assumption College, 31–40.

Departures

Schedule

Rankings

Coaching staff

References

California
California Vulcans football seasons
California Vulcans football